Waghaz is a district in Ghazni province, Afghanistan. It was formed in 2005 from part of Muqur District, and has a population estimated at 27,900.

Administration

Geography

Healthcare

Education 
The Rana Kheil boys and girls school was renovated in 2003. Funding was provided by the School of Hope for the rehabilitation of the school building.

Demographics

Infrastructure

Natural Resources

See also 
 Districts of Afghanistan
 Ghazni Province

References

Gallery 

Districts of Ghazni Province